Brookline Township is an inactive township in Greene County, in the U.S. state of Missouri.

Brookline Township took its name from the community of Brookline, Missouri.

References

Townships in Missouri
Townships in Greene County, Missouri